An aspergilloma is a clump of mold which exists in a body cavity such as a paranasal sinus or an organ such as the lung. By definition, it is caused by fungi of the genus Aspergillus.

Signs and symptoms
People with aspergillomata typically remain asymptomatic until the condition is fairly advanced; in some cases even for decades. Diagnosis is often made as a result of an incidental finding on a chest X-ray or CT scan that may be performed as part of the workup for another unrelated condition. However, a small percentage of aspergillomata invade into a blood vessel which can result in bleeding. Thus, the most common symptom of associated with aspergillomata is coughing up blood (hemoptysis). This may result in life-threatening hemorrhage, though the amount of blood lost is usually inconsequential.

Aspergillomata can also form in other organs. They can form abscesses in solid organs such as the brain or kidney, usually in people who are immunocompromised. They can also develop within body cavities such as the sphenoid or paranasal sinuses, the ear canal, and rarely on surfaces such as heart valves.

Cause

The most common organ affected by aspergilloma is the lung. Aspergilloma mainly affects people with underlying cavitary lung disease such as tuberculosis,  sarcoidosis, bronchiectasis, cystic fibrosis and systemic immunodeficiency. Aspergillus fumigatus, the most common causative species, is typically inhaled as small (2 to 3 micron) spores. The fungus settles in a cavity and is able to grow free from interference because critical elements of the immune system are unable to penetrate into the cavity. As the fungus multiplies, it forms a ball, which incorporates dead tissue from the surrounding lung, mucus, and other debris.

Diagnosis
Diagnosis of aspergilloma is by serum IgE levels which are usually raised in this condition.

Treatment
Most cases of aspergilloma do not require treatment. Treatment of diseases which increase the risk of aspergilloma, such as tuberculosis, may help to prevent their formation. In cases complicated by severe hemoptysis or other associated conditions such as pleural empyema or pneumothorax, surgery may be required to remove the aspergilloma and the surrounding lung tissue by doing a lobectomy or other types of resection and thus stop the bleeding. There has been interest in treatment with antifungal medications such as itraconazole, none has yet been shown to reliably eradicate aspergillomata.

Although most fungi—and especially Aspergillus—fail to grow in healthy human tissue, significant growth may occur in people whose adaptive immune system is compromised, such as those with chronic granulomatous disease, who are undergoing chemotherapy, or who have recently undergone a bone marrow transplantation. Within the lungs of such individuals, the fungal hyphae spread out as a spherical growth. With the restoration of normal defense mechanisms, neutrophils and lymphocytes are attracted to the edge of the spherical fungal growth where they lyse, releasing tissue-digesting enzymes as a normal function. A sphere of the infected lung is thus cleaved from the adjacent lung. This sphere flops around in the resulting cavity and is recognized on x-ray as a fungus ball. This process is beneficial as a potentially serious invasive fungal infection is converted into surface colonization. Although the fungus is inactivated in the process, surgeons may choose to operate to reduce the possibility of bleeding. Microscopic examination of surgically removed recently formed fungus balls clearly shows a sphere of dead lung containing fungal hyphae. Microscopic examination of older lesions reveals mummified tissue which may reveal faint residual lung or hyphal structures.

References

External links 

Lung disorders
Animal fungal diseases